The 1858 Connecticut gubernatorial election was held on April 5, 1858. Former Norwich mayor and Republican nominee William Alfred Buckingham defeated former congressman and Democratic nominee James T. Pratt with 51.97% of the vote.

General election

Candidates
Major party candidates

William Alfred Buckingham, Republican
James T. Pratt, Democratic

Results

References

1858
Connecticut
Gubernatorial